The 2007 Portuguese motorcycle Grand Prix was the fourteenth round of the 2007 MotoGP Championship. It took place on the weekend of 14–16 September 2007 at the Autódromo do Estoril located in Estoril, Portugal.

MotoGP classification

250 cc classification

125 cc classification

Championship standings after the race (MotoGP)

Below are the standings for the top five riders and constructors after round fourteen has concluded.

Riders' Championship standings

Constructors' Championship standings

 Note: Only the top five positions are included for both sets of standings.

References

Portuguese motorcycle Grand Prix
Portuguese
Motorcycle Grand Prix